The 1967 Cronulla-Sutherland Sharks season was the club's inaugural season in the New South Wales Rugby Football League premiership.

Ladder

Results

References

Cronulla-Sutherland Sharks seasons
Cronulla-Sutherland Sharks season